Joseph Dorsey House was a historic building in West Brownsville, Pennsylvania.  It is designated as a historic residential landmark/farmstead by the Washington County History & Landmarks Foundation.

The house no longer stands, having been destroyed by a 1993 fire.

References

External links

[ National Register nomination form]

Houses on the National Register of Historic Places in Pennsylvania
Georgian architecture in Pennsylvania
Houses completed in 1787
Houses in Washington County, Pennsylvania
1993 fires in the United States
Burned houses in the United States
1787 establishments in Pennsylvania
National Register of Historic Places in Washington County, Pennsylvania